Bolyartsi is a village in the municipality of Avren, in Varna Province, Bulgaria.

References

Villages in Varna Province